David Charles Hunt (born April 1961 in Canning Town, London) is an English organised crime boss linked to violence, fraud, prostitution, money laundering and murder. He heads a gang dubbed The Hunt Syndicate, which has been described as being an extensive criminal empire that has so far evaded significant penetration from law enforcement. Hunt is known in gangland circles as Long Fella due to his height of 6 ft 5 inches. In a confidential police report from the early 2000s which was later leaked online, Hunt's gang was said to include family members and the father of a well known reality TV star.

Hunt has been described by Metropolitan Police sources as being "too big to bring down". He became a close friend and associate of Reggie Kray, visiting him in prison in 2000 just prior to his death. He was the owner of "Hunt's Waste Recycling" in Dagenham, which during the nearby 2012 Olympics closing ceremony, was the centre of the "largest fire in several years" in London which saw 40 fire engines and over 200 fire fighters attend the scene. Now known as Connect Waste the recycling centre is run by Hunt's long time friend, Phil Mitchell.

Hunt resides at The Morleys, a 7 bedroom mansion in Woodside Green, Great Hallingbury on the Essex/Hertfordshire border, close to Bishop's Stortford. Complete with swimming pool, tennis court, gym and guard dog pen, the mansion was purchased in September 1993 for £600,000. In 2013, it was revealed that Hunt had failed to declare any income or pay tax between 1982 and 1996, and he was unable to recall in court how he had been able to afford the property.

Early life
Hunt was born in 1961 in Canning Town to May (née Wicks) and George Hunt, the youngest of 13 children.

The Snipers
In the mid 1980s, Hunt joined The Snipers street gang who were involved in lorry hijackings in Essex and East London. Six members of his family were already members, with police intelligence reports identifying David and his brother Stephen as two of the six main leaders. He was arrested 7 times during his time with the gang, but witnesses would drop their allegations. In 1986, he was given a nine-month suspended jail sentence for handling stolen goods. He then moved into the Soho sex trade, purchasing property that operated as a pornography shop and brothel. Police intelligence also put him at the centre of a criminal network involved in protection rackets at nightclubs and pubs.

The Hunt Syndicate
A police investigation into organised crime groups in north and east London, codenamed Operation Tiberius, included details of the  Hunt Syndicate's activities. The Tiberius report stated that the syndicate had managed to evade prosecution through a combination of utilising corrupt police contacts, and the intimidation of witnesses. The crime gang were uncovered by the crime squad in Newham, East London in 2006, when a scrapyard in the Docklands area of East London was searched for stolen metal. When another nearby property was raided as part of that operation, 42 containers were unexpectedly discovered to contain the contents of 18 lorry thefts and a commercial burglary. Counterfeit goods were also seized.  Dave McKelvey, head of the crime squad, discovered that the gang had been corrupting police officers for over a decade and that despite a gang insider leaking information to the police, the information was never acted upon. Despite overwhelming evidence, the case collapsed after a corrupt anti-corruption detective sent a dossier to prosecutors raising concerns about McKelvey, who was then investigated for two years (the investigation was found to be fatally flawed and McKelvey exonerated, with Detective Chief Superintendent Albert Patrick stating that he struggled to understand what McKelvey was being accused of).  As a result of the raids, McKelvey was informed, whilst interviewing a petty criminal, that a known contract-killer had been contracted for £1 million to kill three police officers including McKelvey himself, who now lives under round the clock police protection.

In 2004, a book written by former Hunt associate Jimmy Holmes (under the pseudonym Horace Silver), titled Judas Pig, was published. Presented as a fictional book based on a career criminal called Billy Abrahams, it was a thinly disguised autobiography of Holmes's time as a career criminal during the mid-80s and through to 1995, with the names of well known living gangsters changed to avoid libel action. Hunt, referred to in the book as Abrahams' "psychopathic partner in crime" Danny, is exposed as a violent gangland boss, who is responsible for numerous murders and serious assaults whilst running drugs, pornography and protection operations in London and Essex. Danny (David Hunt) falls out with Abrahams (Jimmy Holmes) and puts a contract out on his life. A follow up book titled The Charity Committee was re-written and published in July 2013, with the real names of the main protagonist included.  The book is currently difficult to obtain, as it was withdrawn by Amazon due to a complaint from Hunt's solicitors.

Failed legal action against The Sunday Times
In 2013, Hunt unsuccessfully tried to sue The Sunday Times, who three years earlier had exposed him as a violent "underworld king", with the judge stating that it was "reasonable to describe the claimant as a violent and dangerous criminal and the head of an organised crime group implicated in murder, drug trafficking and fraud". Hunt was represented by Hugh Tomlinson QC, who is the chairman of the Hacked Off campaign and also a member of the Matrix Chambers group of barristers of whom Cherie Blair is a founding member. Tomlinson portrayed Hunt as a "rough diamond" who "was a misunderstood property tycoon whose only passions in life were his family and racing pigeons", and argued that it was not in the public interest for the newspaper to have revealed how Hunt had been embroiled in a gangland turf war over land the Government had been due to buy in the lead-up to the Olympics.

During the trial, The Sunday Times employed five professional bodyguards to protect their witnesses. On the second day of the trial the bodyguards walked off the job after being approached in a pub, with another security firm refusing to take the job on due to the dangerous reputation of the Hunt Syndicate. As the article had been based largely on leaked Serious Organised Crime Agency and police documents, the paper had to rely on these as evidence. When the paper approached the Metropolitan Police before publicly disclosing the leaked documents, the Met responded by unsuccessfully trying to sue them for the recovery of those documents and to obtain an order banning their publication. The Met also launched an internal investigation to try and identify the source of the leak. Sunday Times journalist Michael Gillard was named British Journalism Awards Journalist of the Year in 2013 for the expose, but was unable to attend the award ceremony due to security concerns meaning that he was unable to attend public events in London.

It was revealed in May 2014 that Lloyds Bank had loaned Hunt up to £5 million at the time of the case, after a £4.2 million loan with Barclays was called in when staff read media reports of the case. It was also revealed that whilst owing The Sunday Times £805,000 in legal costs, Hunt was loaned £1 million by former pornographer and newspaper owner and current West Ham United F.C. co-chairman David Sullivan. The loan was made from Sullivan's finance firm GC CO NO 102 to Hunt's business Hunt's (UK) Properties. A member of the Treasury Select Committee believed that the Financial Conduct Authority should investigate the loans.

Contract on Metropolitan Police officers
In 2016 details of a plot to assassinate three police officers who were investigating Hunt were revealed in full detail in an episode of BBC's Panorama. For a £1 million contract, Hunt had summoned Yardie hitman Carl 'The Dread' Robinson to a boat in Marbella and instructed him to kill the officers. Despite the detectives being tipped off there was a contract against them, their superiors, instead of investigating this, suspended the three officers and investigated them for corruption.  They were later cleared of any wrongdoing.

Panama Papers
Amidst the Panama Papers leak of April 2016, it was revealed by The Guardian that Hunt was a client of Mossack Fonseca, and owned an offshore company, EMM Limited, which held ownership of an iron and steel business in East London.

References

External links
 Royal Court of Justice Case HQ10D02588: David Hunt v Times Newspapers Limited

Living people
1961 births
English gangsters
English criminals
People from Canning Town